Naughty is the second studio album, third album overall, by English acid house DJ and record producer Adamski, released in 1992 on MCA Records. It includes the single "Never Goin' Down!", featuring Jimi Polo, which was backed as a double A-side with "Born to Be Alive!", featuring Soho (No. 51 in the UK Singles Chart), plus the singles "Get Your Body!", featuring Nina Hagen (UK No. 68), and "Back to Front" (UK No. 63). None of the singles achieved similar success as Adamski's previous singles and the album failed to chart.

Track listing
All tracks written by Adamski, except where noted.

Note
"Never Goin' Down!" incorporates parts of the Adamski track "Future Freak", from the album Doctor Adamski's Musical Pharmacy.

Personnel
Adapted from the album's liner notes.

Adamski – vocals, guitar, pots & pans, programming, synthesizer ("all thynthathitherth") 
Marc Auerbach – additional programming
Bibby Rankin – drums (track 11)
Arthur Bumble & Deptford Dave (Dave Pine) – additional programming
Allan Dias – guitar
Nina Hagen – vocals (track 5)
Danny Hyde – additional programming
Lee – spoken words (track 10)
Natali – vocals (track 6)
Nellie the Elephant – bass
Jimi Polo – vocals (track 8), piano (track 9)
Ricardo – rapping (tracks 3 & 6)
Guy Sigsworth – additional programming
Jonny Slut – chorus vocals (track 11)
Soho – vocals (track 2)
Charlie Spliff – bass guitar
Mark Tinley – guitar, additional programming
Youth – bass guitar (track 4)
Strings contracted by Audrey Riley
Produced by Adamski
Engineered by Danny Hyde and Deptford Dave (Dave Pine)
Mixed by Adamski and Mike "Spike" Drake
Cover by Andrew Sutton
Photography by Simon Fowler

References

External links
Naughty at Discogs

1992 albums
MCA Records albums
Adamski albums